Below is a list of the largest nebulae so far discovered, ordered by actual size (a list by angular diameter is listed separately below). This list is prone to change because of inconsistencies between studies, the great distances of nebulae from our stellar neighbourhood, and the constant refinement of technology and engineering. Nebulae have no standardized boundaries, so the measurements are subject to revision. Lastly, scientists are still defining the features and parameters of nebulae. Because of these rapid developments and adjustments, this list might be unreliable.

List

By angular diameter

See also
List of largest cosmic structures
List of largest known stars
List of largest planets
List of most massive stars
List of most massive black holes
List of largest galaxies

Notes

References

Largest
Nebulae, Largest